Disc golf, formerly known as frisbee golf, is a flying disc sport in which players throw a disc at a target; it is played using rules similar to golf. Most disc golf discs are made out of polypropylene plastic, otherwise known as polypropene, which is a thermoplastic polymer resin used in a wide variety of applications. Discs are also made using a variety of other plastic types that are heated and molded into individual discs. The sport is usually played on a course with 9 or 18 holes (baskets). Players complete a hole by throwing a disc from a tee pad or area toward a target, known as a basket, throwing again from where the previous throw landed, until the basket is reached. The baskets are formed by wire with hanging chains above the basket, designed to catch the incoming discs, which then fall into the basket, for a score. Usually, the number of throws a player uses to reach each basket is tallied (often in relation to par), and players seek to complete each hole in the lowest number of total throws.  Par is the number of strokes an expert player is expected to make for a given hole or a group of holes (usually 9 or 18). 

The game is played in about 40 countries and, as of March 31, 2022, there are  active members of the Professional Disc Golf Association (PDGA) worldwide.

Origin and early history 

Disc golf was first invented in the early 1900s. The first game was held in Bladworth, Saskatchewan, Canada, in 1927. Ronald Franklin Gibson and a group of his Bladworth Elementary School buddies played a game of throwing tin lids into 4-foot wide circles drawn into sandy patches on their school grounds. They called the game Tin Lid Golf and played on a fairly regular basis.  However, after they grew older and went their separate ways, the game came to an end. It was not until the 1970s that modern disc golf would be introduced to Canadians at the Canadian Open Frisbee Championships in Toronto and Vancouver, British Columbia.

Modern disc golf started in the early 1960s, but there is debate over who came up with the idea first. The consensus is that multiple groups of people played independently throughout the 1960s. Students at Rice University in Houston, Texas, for example, held tournaments with trees as targets as early as 1964, and in the early 1960s, players in Pendleton King Park in Augusta, Georgia, would toss Frisbees into 50-gallon barrel trash cans designated as targets. In 1968 Frisbee Golf was also played in Alameda Park in Santa Barbara, California, by teenagers in the Anacapa and Sola street areas. Gazebos, water fountains, lamp posts, and trees were all part of the course. This took place for several years and an Alameda Park collectors edition disc still exists, though rare, as few were made. Clifford Towne from this group went on to hold a National Time Aloft record.

1970s 

Ed Headrick, also known as "Steady" Ed Headrick, (June 28, 1924 – August 12, 2002) was an American toy inventor. He is most well known as the father of both the modern-day Frisbee and of the sport and game of disc golf.

In 1975 Headrick's tenure at Wham-O where he helped redesign the flying disc known as the frisbee ended, and ties between Headrick and Wham-O eventually split. Headrick left the company to start out on his own to focus all his efforts on his new interest, which he coined and trademarked "Disc Golf".

In 1976 "Steady" Ed Headrick and his son Ken Headrick started the first disc golf company, the Disc Golf Association (DGA).[3] The purpose of DGA was to manufacture discs and targets and to formalize the game for disc golf. The first disc golf target was Ed's pole hole design which basically consisted of a pole sticking out of the ground.

The First Disc Golf Basket
In 1977, Headrick and his son Ken developed the modern basket catch for disc golf, US Patent 4039189A, titled Flying Disc Entrapment Device, which they trademarked "Disc Pole Hole". The Disc Pole Hole created a standardized catching device that had a chain-hanger that held vertical hanging rows of chain out and away from a center pole. The vertical rows of chain came together forming a parabolic shape above and angling down towards a metal basket that attached to and surrounded the center pole, and could catch a disc from all directions.

Ed and his company DGA revised and obtained patents for basket designs until his death in 2002. Today there are over 13,000 courses installed throughout the world, the majority of them using baskets modeled on the Disc Pole Hole DGA baskets Headrick designed.

2020s

In December 2022, the Professional Disc Golf Association announced that trans women would be prohibited from competing in the female division at Majors.

Disc golf courses 
Most disc golf courses have 9 or 18 holes, and exceptions most often have holes in multiples of three. Courses with 6, 10, 12, 21, 24 or 27 holes are not uncommon. Course designers use trees, bushes, elevation changes, water hazards, and distance variation, along with out-of-bounds zones and mandatory flight paths to make each hole challenging and unique. Many courses include multiple tee positions or multiple target positions to cater to players of different ability levels.

Most disc golf courses are built in more natural and less manicured environments than golf and require minimal maintenance. Professional course designers consider safety a critical factor in course design, and are careful to minimize the danger of being hit by a flying disc while providing designs that create strategy in play and variety in shots for enjoyment. Holes are designed to require a range of different throws to challenge players with different strengths or particular skills. Many courses are central organizing points for local disc golf clubs, and some include shops selling disc golf equipment. More than 80% of the courses listed on Disc Golf Course Review are listed as public and free to play.

List of disc golf courses by country 
Three countries account for 85% of all disc golf courses worldwide: the United States (75%), Finland (7%) and Canada (3%). Other notable countries include Sweden, and Estonia, which has the highest density of disc golf courses per km2 of dry land of any country and the second-highest number of courses per capita, between Iceland and Finland, which have 150 and 111 courses per million inhabitants, respectively. Outside North American and European strongholds, Japan, Australia, New Zealand, and South Korea have the most courses. There are disc golf courses on every continent, including 24 in Latin America, 8 in Africa, and one in Antarctica. Åland has been defined as the world's largest single disc golf park, with one course in each of the 16 municipalities of Åland.

* indicates "Disc golf in COUNTRY or TERRITORY" links.

Tees 
A disc golf tee (commonly referred to as a tee box or the box) is the starting position of a hole. The PDGA recommends that the tee box be no smaller than 1.2 meters wide by 3 meters long. The tee box is usually a pad of concrete, asphalt, rubber, gravel, or artificial turf. Some courses have natural turf with only the front of the tee position marked or no tee boxes at all and players begin from a general location based on the course layout.

Signs 
Established courses have tee signs near each tee position. Signs may depict a simple map of the hole including the tee, target, expected disc flight, out-of-bounds areas, water hazards, trees, and mandatory paths. Signs typically include the distance to the hole, and par. Some courses include a unique name for the hole and may have sponsor logos. They are often supplemented with a larger sign near the course entrance which has a map of the entire course.

Targets 

Although early courses were played using trees, fence posts, or park equipment as the target, standard disc golf baskets are by far the most common type of target on modern courses. Some courses feature tone targets that are designed to make a distinctive sound when hit with a disc. Disc golf baskets are constructed with a central pole holding a basket under an assembly of hanging chains. When a disc hits the chains, it is often, but not always, deflected into the basket. Per PDGA rules, in order to complete a hole with a basket target, the disc must "enter the target above the top of the tray and below the bottom of the chain support, and come to rest supported by the target. There are many different brands of baskets made by numerous manufacturers.

Gameplay 

The sport of disc golf is set up similar to a game of golf. A "round" is played on a disc golf course consisting of a number of "holes", usually 9 or 18. Each hole includes a tee position for starting play and a disc golf target some distance away, often with obstacles such as trees, hills or bodies of water in between. Players begin by throwing a disc from the tee, without crossing over the front of the tee prior to releasing the disc when throwing. This could lead to a fault similar to a bowling foot fault in cricket. Players then navigate the hole by picking up the disc where it lands and throwing again until they reach the target. The object of the game is to get through the course with the lowest number of total throws. Play is usually in groups of five or fewer, with each player taking turn at the tee box, then progressing with the player furthest from the hole throwing first, while the other players stand aside.

Each course is unique, so each course requires a different combination of throws to complete, with the best players aiming to shape the flight of the disc to account for distance, terrain, obstacles and weather. In order to facilitate making different shots, players carry a variety of discs with different flight characteristics, choosing an appropriate disc for each throw. Some players also carry a mini marker disc, used to accurately mark the throwing position before each throw.  Use of mini marker discs is particularly prevalent in formal competitive play.

Many courses include out-of-bounds areas, commonly called "OB zones" or just "OB". If the disc lands in these areas, the player is usually required to add a penalty throw onto his or her score and continue play from near where the disc entered the out-of-bounds zone. Some courses include out-of-bounds areas with special rules requiring the player to resume play from a specified area called a drop zone, or requiring the player to restart the hole from the tee. Some courses also include Mandatories (also called "Mandos") which require the path of the disc to be above, below or to one side of a specific line indicated by a sign.

By tradition, players throw from the tee box in the order of their score on the previous hole, with the lowest scorer throwing first. Most players also follow a loose code of courtesy while playing, which includes norms such as standing out of the sight line of the throwing player and avoiding making distracting noises. Because a thrown disc could injure someone, the Professional Disc Golf Association recommends that players "Never throw into a blind area or when spectators, pedestrians or facility users are within range."

Formal competitive play is governed by the PDGA Official Rules of Disc Golf and the PDGA Competition Manual for Disc Golf events.

Disc types 

Disc golf discs are smaller than Ultimate flying discs or general-purpose recreational frisbees. They typically measure  in diameter and weigh . Discs used for disc golf are designed and shaped for control, speed, and accuracy, while general-purpose flying discs, such as those used for playing guts or ultimate, have a more traditional shape, similar to a catch disc. There is a wide variety of discs used in disc golf and they are generally divided into three categories: drivers, mid-range discs, and putters.

Driver 
Drivers are recognized by their sharp, beveled edge and have most of their mass concentrated on the outer rim of the disc rather than distributed equally throughout. They are optimized for aerodynamics and designed to travel maximum distances at high speeds. They are typically thrown by experienced players during tee-off and other long distance fairway throws.

Some disc brands further sub-divide their drivers into different categories. For example, Innova has Distance Drivers and Fairway Drivers, with a fairway driver being somewhere between a distance driver and a mid-range disc. Discraft has three categories of drivers: Long Drivers, Extra Long Drivers, and Maximum Distance Drivers. Another type of driver, used less frequently, is a roller. As the name indicates, it has an edge designed to roll rather than fly. (Although any disc can be used for a roller, some behave quite differently than others.)

Because the physics of a disc require "snap" or "flick", which means putting spin on the disc, new players generally find that throwing a distance driver accurately can be somewhat difficult and will require experience with golf disc response. This is why it is better for players to begin with fairway drivers, long drivers, or even mid-ranges, and incorporate maximum distance drivers as their strength and disc control increases. Most players that are starting off will be most likely throwing lighter discs.

The world record distance for a golf disc was once , thrown by Simon Lizotte on October 25, 2014.

Mid-range 
Mid-range discs feature a dull, beveled edge and a moderate rim width. They offer more control than drivers, but they have a smaller range. Mid-range discs are typically used as approach discs. Beginner players will often use mid-ranges instead of drivers at tee-off, as they require less strength and technique to fly straight than higher speed drivers.

Putter 
Putters are designed to fly straight, predictably, and very slowly compared to mid-range discs and drivers. They are typically used for tight, controlled shots that are close to the basket, although some players use them for short drives where trees or other obstacles come into play. Usually a pro carries 1–7 putters depending on their flight characteristics. As a beginner it is suggested that you only use a putter or mid-range while building fundamentals such as proper follow-through, disc throw positioning, and hyzer/anhyzer technique. Additionally, higher speed discs will not fly properly without a fast enough release snap, so a putter or mid-range with lower snap requirements is more forgiving and will behave in a more regular way.

Stability 
Stability is the measurement of a disc's tendency to bank laterally during its flight.  A disc that is over-stable will tend to track left (for a right handed, backhand throw), whereas a disc that is under-stable will tend to track right (also for a right handed, backhand throw). The stability rating of the discs differs depending on the manufacturer of the disc. Innova Discs rate stability as "turn" and "fade". "Turn" references how the disc will fly at high speed during the beginning and middle of its flight, and is rated on a scale of +1 to −5, where +1 is the most overstable and −5 is the most understable. "Fade" references how the disc will fly at lower speeds towards the end of its flight, and is rated on a scale of 0 to 5, where 0 has the least fade, and 5 has the most fade. For example, a disc with a turn of −5 and fade of 0 will fly to the right (for right handed, backhand throw) the majority of its flight then curl back minimally left at the end. A disc with a turn of −1 and a fade of +3 will turn slightly right during the middle of its flight and turn hard left as it slows down. These ratings can be found on the discs themselves or from the manufacturer's web site. Discraft prints the stability rating on all discs and also provides this information on their web site. The stability ranges from 3 to −2 for Discraft discs; however Discraft's ratings are more of a combination of turn and fade with the predominance being fade.

Spin (rotation) has little influence on lift and drag forces but impacts a disc's stability during flight. Imagine a spinning top. A gentle nudge will knock it off its axis of rotation for a second, but it will not topple over because spin adds gyroscopic stability. In the same way, a flying disc resists rolling (flipping over) because spin adds gyroscopic stability. A flying disc will maintain its spin rate even as it loses velocity. Toward the end of a disc's flight, when the spin and velocity lines cross, a flying disc will predictably begin to fade. The degree to which a disc will fade depends on its pitch angle and design.

Plastics 

There are a variety of different discs, each made with a specific plastic. Plastics such as DX, J-Pro, Pro-D, X-Line, D-line, retro, and R-Pro from Innova, Latitude 64°, Discmania, and Discraft are some of the less durable, but good for beginners due to their lower prices, compared to the higher end plastics. Plastics such as Champion, Titanium, FLX, GStar, Gold Line, Tournament Plastic, Fuzion and Star, which are the best offered from the same companies, have the best quality, durability and flight compared to the other types available. There are also plastics that provide additional functionality, e.g. glow in the dark plastic and plastic that allows the disc to float in water. Most companies also offer a line of plastic that is much lighter than the maximum throwing weight (normally filled with air bubbles) which is conducive to beginners or players with less arm speed. Players might prefer bright colored discs to contrast most green flora and recover their disc easier.

Throwing styles 
While there are many different grips and styles to throwing the disc, there are two basic throwing techniques: backhand and forehand (or sidearm). These techniques vary in effectiveness under different circumstances. Their understanding and mastery can greatly improve a player's game, and offer diverse options in maneuvering the disc to the basket with greater efficacy. Many players use what is referred to as a run-up during their drive. This is practiced to build more forward disc momentum and distance. Throwing styles vary from player to player, and there is no standard throwing style.

All discs when thrown will naturally fall to a certain direction determined by the rotation direction of the disc when released, this direction is termed Hyzer, the natural fall of the disc, or Anhyzer, making the disc fall against its natural flight pattern. For a right-handed backhand throw (RHBH), the disc will naturally fall to the left. For a right-handed forehand throw (RHFH), the disc will naturally fall to the right. For a left-handed, backhand throw (LHBH), the disc will naturally fall to the right. For a left-handed, forehand throw (LHFH), the disc will naturally fall to the left.

Backhand 
To perform this throw, the disc is rapidly drawn from across the front of the body, and released towards a forward aimpoint. Due to the potential snap available with this technique, one can expect greater distance than with a forehand throw. It is important to initiate momentum from the feet and allow it to travel up the body, hips and shoulders, culminating in the transfer of energy to the disc.

Forehand 
The forehand (sidearm) throw is performed by drawing the disc from behind and partially across the front of the body: similar to a sidearm throw in baseball. The term sidearm actually predates the term forehand, which is seemingly in use today as a simpler means to communicate the technique, equating to a tennis forehand.

Alternative throws 
The following examples of throws may be used to better deliver a disc where the former common two throws would be impeded by obstacles such as bushes, trees, boulders, or artificial structures.

Common alternative styles
The Hatchet (or Tomahawk). Gripped similarly to the sidearm toss but thrown with an overhand motion; the disc orientation is nearly perpendicular to the ground over much of the flight.
The Thumber (or U.D.). Thrown in an overhand manner but with thumb held on the disc's underside.
The Roller. Thrown either backhand or forehand, the disc will predominately be in contact with the ground. The disc remains in motion while travelling on its edge at a slight angle, and can travel exceedingly far in ideal situations. Once perfected, the roller is an invaluably versatile tool in the golfer's arsenal.
The Turbo-Putt Thrown with a putter when the player holds the disc upright, supported in the middle by the thumb, with the finger tips outside of the edge, somewhat like a waiter holding a platter. The player stands with the leg opposite from the throwing arm forward, reaches back, and then extends their arm towards the basket, throwing the disc in a motion similar to that of throwing a dart.  Ideally the thrower does not rotate his wrist; the act of following through will give the disc its spin. The Turbo-Putt is a throw known for its accuracy, but it has extremely limited range.

Other alternative styles
The Baseball or Grenade. Thrown as in the backhand, but with the disc upside-down. This shot is used often to get up and down on a short shot where there is danger of a shot rolling away or going out of bounds if thrown too far.  Primarily used on downhill shots but can be used to go up and over. Also due to the quick turn and backspin of this shot, it is sometimes used to get out of the woods.
The Overhand wristflip (or chicken-wing [ambiguous origin] ). This is a very difficult and stylized throw with which accomplished free-stylers and classic ultimate players are familiar; it is less used in disc golf.  It is thrown in the same manner as the "baseball" but drawn on the sidearm side of the body, and by inverting the arm and disc. Using the thumb as the power finger, the disc is drawn from the thigh area rearwards and up from behind the body to over the shoulder, releasing toward a forward aimpoint. The disc flies in a conventional flight pattern. To the untrained eye, this appears to be an ungainly throw. It is, however, elegant and accurate. The term "overhand wristflip" has been in use since at least circa 1970.

Scoring 
Stroke play is the most common scoring method used in the sport but there are many other forms. These include match play, skins, speed golf and captain's choice, which in disc golf is referred to as "doubles" (not to be confused with partner or team play).

Regardless of which form of play the participants choose, the main objectives of disc golf are conceptually the same as traditional golf in the sense that players follow the same scorekeeping technique.

Scoring terms for a single hole:

 Condor – Where a player is four throws under par, or "-4".
 Albatross (or double-eagle) – Where a player is three throws under par, or "-3".
 Eagle (or double-birdie) – Where a player is two throws under par, or "-2".
 Birdie – Where a player is one throw under par, or "-1".
 Par – Where a player has thrown par, "E" or "0".
 Bogey – Where a player is one throw over par, or "+1".
 Double Bogey – Where a player is two throws over par, or "+2".
 Triple Bogey – Where a player is three throws over par, or "+3".

Doubles play is a unique style of play that many local courses offer on a weekly basis. In this format, teams of two golfers are determined. Sometimes this is done by random draw, and other times it is a pro-am format. On the course, it is a "best-disc" scramble, meaning both players throw their tee shot and then decide which lie they would like to play. Both players then play from the same lie, again choosing which lie is preferable. The World Amateur Doubles Format includes best shot, alternate shot, best score (players play singles and take the best result from the hole) and worst shot (both players must sink the putt).

Tournaments 

Tournaments are held nationwide and year long in the United States. Sanctioned Tournament play is communicated through the Professional Disc Golf Association Membership. The PDGA provides international, professional, and amateur disc golf tournaments as well as communicates event results, opinions and other information beneficial to the sport via electronic and printed media.  In 1982 the PDGA hosted the first World Championship Tournament.  Since then, the World Championships have been held in 17 different American states, as well as Toronto, Ontario.

Disc golf tournaments are popular around the world.  As with traditional golf, there are many championship tournaments.  One of the largest is the United States Disc Golf Championship, held in October in Rock Hill, South Carolina.

Every year, the largest teams tournament in the world is held in Austin, Texas, by John Houck.

To prove the year-round sustainability of the sport, annual winter tournaments known as Ice Bowls are held at courses around the world.  Using the motto "No Wimps, No Whiners", Ice Bowls collectively are designed to create sport awareness, and are considered charity events that typically benefit a food bank local to a given tournament location. The official website reports that the 2010 Ice Bowls raised over $250,000 and donated over 67,000 pounds of food in the 222 tournaments for the year. Other charitable tournaments include the annual St. Jude Disc Golf Tournament which started in 2017 and has raised over $100,000 for St. Jude Children's Research Hospital.

Popularity 

Disc golf is a rapidly growing sport worldwide, and is the 4th fastest growing sport in United States, behind mixed martial arts, roller derby, and parkour. DGCourseReview.com, which tracks courses worldwide along with opening dates, shows a rapid increase in installed permanent courses with an average of more than 400 new courses added each year between 2007 and 2017. The site lists 9744 courses worldwide (in Feb 2022).

Although most players play on a casual, amateur level, the professional disc golf scene is also growing rapidly, with the top professionals playing full-time and earning their livings through tournament winnings and sponsorship from equipment manufacturers. Online viewership of major tournaments and events has increased rapidly, with coverage of the 2019 world championship achieving more than 3 million views on YouTube, and a clip of a single albatross by professional Philo Braithwaite boasting more than 1.4 million views.

Post-round coverage 
Increased popularity of disc golf can be largely attributed to increased coverage of pro tour events, available for free on YouTube. Jomez Productions, Gatekeeper Media, and Gk Pro all film events the day of, and then air them the morning after. Often, these videos can have a reach of as many as 200,000 viewers. In the 2020 season, Jomez Productions and the Disc Golf Pro Tour reached and agreement with CBS Sports and ESPN 2 to air post production coverage of a tournament on each network. The Dynamic Discs Open was shown on CBS Sports, and the Disc Golf Pro Tour championship was re-aired on ESPN2 November 24, 2020. With 225,000 viewers, it was the most-watched show on the channel that day.

Women in disc golf 
While there are more male than female players, the Women's Disc Golf Association exists to encourage female players and arrange women's tournaments. A PDGA survey from 2020 states that out of its 71,016 active members, 4,752 are female.

Several companies have started programs and websites to help attract women to the sport. The PDGA Women's Committee is "Dedicated to Attract, Encourage, and Retain Female Participation in Organized Disc Golf Events". The PDGA Women's Committee set historical records on 12 May 2012 by running the Inaugural Women's Global Event that attracted 636 female players in 24 states and 4 countries. The Women's Global Event was expected to take place every two years from 2014, with hopes of increasing the number of participants. The 2021 Women's Global Event had 99 registered tournaments that spanned the globe, from Minnesota to Malaysia, with a combined turnout of 3224 women competing in 23 different PDGA divisions.

There are also disc golf companies such as Disc-Diva, that have started up with a primary, though not exclusive, focus on women in the sport, promoting accessories geared towards women and using catch phrases like "you wish you threw like a girl". Sassy Pants is another group that focuses on getting more involvement from women in the sport, advocating for sponsorship of women to enter tournaments.

Women's disc golf teams are involved in the National Collegiate Disc Golf Championship, and the Mississippi State Women's Team were the inaugural champions.

The Disc Golf Hall of Fame 

Inductees:

Disc golf associations

See also 
 Flying disc sports
 Glossary of disc golf terms
 List of disc golf players
 List of disc golf brands and manufacturers

Notes

References

External links 

 Professional Disc Golf Association (PDGA) – official rules, course directory and list of members
 History of Early Frisbee Sports
 History of Disc Golf, Ultimate and Frisbee Pioneers
 Ice Bowl HQ
 Disc Golf Reviews

 
Flying disc games
Forms of golf
Individual sports
Sports originating in Canada
Sports originating in the United States
Throwing sports